Yukhoe is a raw meat dish in Korean cuisine. It is most commonly made of beef but it can come in various kinds and cuts of meat.

Yukhoe literally means 'raw (hoe) meat (yuk)'. Therefore, in the strictest context, the term designates any dish of raw meat cut up for consumption without the marinade. But colloquially yukhoe means a dish of marinated raw beef slices. Though relatively rare to find these days, yukhoe can come in all kinds of meat. Yukhoe made of other meats will mention the source of the meat, for instance, a kkwong-yukhoe is made of pheasant, and a mal-yukhoe is made of horse meat.

Yukhoe is most commonly made of lean cuts such as an eye of round, but more tender cuts of a beef can also be used. The beef is cut into thin strips while removing the fat, then it is seasoned with salt, sugar, sesame oil, pepper, and garlic. Korean pear, raw egg yolk, and pine nuts are commonly used as garnishes. It is similar to a Western tartare or a Levantine kibbeh nayeh.

Yukhoe is also made with other cuts of beef, such as liver, kidney, heart, cheonyeop, or yang, in which case the dish is called gaphoe. The ingredients are thoroughly cleaned and salted, then rinsed and dried to remove unpleasant odors. Gaphoe is usually seasoned with sesame oil, salt and pepper, and is served with a spicy mustard sauce.

History

According to the 19th century cookbook Siuijeonseo, thin slices of tender beef are soaked to remove blood before being finely shredded. The shredded beef is then marinated in a mixed sauce of chopped spring onion, minced garlic, pepper, oil, honey, pine nuts, sesame, and salt. Its dipping sauce, chogochujang, chili pepper condiment mixed with vinegar and sugar) can be altered to taste, with pepper or honey.

Varieties

Beefs

Other meat

Health concerns
Meat in Korean cuisine has highly detailed classifications regarding freshness, quality, and part differentiation for specific cooking methods. Since yukhoe uses raw beef, freshness is the most important criterion, and for this typical dish's beef it is recommended to use no more than one day after defrosting, and traditionally should not be aged more than one day after slaughtering. Regular Korean yukhoe customers are often patrons of trusted restaurants or butcher's shops which have well-known, high-quality beef distributors.

Since 2004, the Korean Government has run the Beef Traceability System. This system requires ID numbers with the age of the beef animal of origin, supplier, distributor, the beef's grade, and butchering date and originating butchery. Most of the good beef restaurants in Korea list their beef's information on the wall. Also, butcher shops post signs saying, "new beef coming day" ( so deureoyoneun nal): these words have become a well-known idiom in Korea  and it means newly butchered beef supplied at the day.

Raw beef can be contaminated with pathogenic bacteria, with enterohemorrhagic E. coli (O111 or O157:H7) being of particular concern. Only by the freshness of beef can the risk be reduced.

Japan 2011 incident

In April and May 2011, five people died and more than 35 people were hospitalised after eating yukke (Japanese spelling) made from beef not designated for raw consumption in various branches of a bulgogi restaurant chain in Toyama and Kanagawa prefectures, Japan, with enterohemorrhagic E. coli bacteria found in many of the cases.

On October 22, 2011, the last hospitalized victim, a 14-year-old boy, died of hemolytic-uremic syndrome. The final death toll of the incident was five people. As a result, the MHLW developed regulations for trimming raw beef to remove surface contamination, and the Japanese Ministry of Health, Labor and Welfare (MHLW) developed new regulations to require cooking the surface 1 cm deep to further reduce contamination. However, since the dimensions of individual pieces of yukhoe/yukke are quite smaller than 1 cm cubes, preparing the beef to this standard would cook it all the way through, and it would no longer be yukhoe/yukke.

Gallery

See also

Hoe
Korean royal court cuisine
 List of beef dishes
Siuijeonseo
Steak tartare
Kitfo

References

External links

  Recipe for yukhoe  at Daum
 Recipe for yukhoe  at Chow.com
Mangchi's Recipe of yukhoe Korean style tartare at Maangchi.com
 Recipe for yukhoe at Souschef.co.uk

Korean royal court cuisine
Raw beef dishes
Korean beef dishes